Sunderland Association Football Club, an English association football club based in Sunderland, Tyne and Wear, was founded in 1879. They joined The Football League in the 1890–91 season replacing Stoke who had failed to be re-elected, making Sunderland the first new club to join the league since its inauguration in 1888. Sunderland remained in the football league for 106 years, albeit in different divisions, until 1996 when they were promoted to the Premier League, which replaced the Football League's First Division at the top of the English football league system in 1992. Since then the club has been relegated back into The Football League on four occasions. They currently compete in the EFL League One after relegation from the EFL Championship in the 2017–18 season.

Sunderland's first team, nicknamed the Black Cats, have competed in a number of nationally contested leagues, and their record against each club faced in those competitions is summarised below. Sunderland played their inaugural league fixture as part of the 1890–91 Football League on 13 September 1890 against Burnley. They met their most recent different league opponent, Morecambe, for the first time in the 2021–22 EFL League One season.

The team that Sunderland have played most in league competition is Aston Villa, against whom they have contested 170 league matches. Villa, Newcastle United and West Bromwich Albion have contested the most draws with Sunderland, having tied 44 games. The Black Cats have won 65 of the league matches against Everton which represents the most they have won against any club. Everton are also the teams to defeat Sunderland the most with 73 wins over them.

Key
 The table includes results of matches played by Sunderland in the Football League and the Premier League.
 For the sake of simplicity, present-day names are used throughout: for example, results against Newton Heath, Small Heath and Woolwich Arsenal are integrated into the records against Manchester United, Birmingham City and Arsenal, respectively
   Teams with this background and symbol in the "Club" column are competing in the 2021–22 EFL League One alongside Sunderland
   Clubs with this background and symbol in the "Club" column are defunct
 P = matches played; W = matches won; D = matches drawn; L = matches lost; F = Goals scored (For); A = Goals conceded (Against); Win% = percentage of total matches won
 The columns headed "First" and "Last" contain the first and most recent seasons in which Sunderland played league matches against each opponent

All-time league record
Statistics correct as of matches played on 30 April 2022.

Footnotes

References
General
 
 
 

Specific

League record by Opponent
Sunderland